Seán Ó hEinirí (26 March 191526 July 1998), known in English as John Henry, was an Irish  (traditional storyteller) and a native of Cill Ghallagáin in County Mayo. He was possibly the last monolingual speaker of the Irish language.

Early life 

Ó hEinirí was born in Cill Ghallagáin (Kilgalligan), County Mayo, to Michael Henry and Mary (Connolly). He was from an early age determined to collect as many ancient legends and traditional stories as he could. He was a currach-using fisherman, and a skilled rower.

Contributions to the Irish language 

He became known as a talented seanchaí, and the folklorist Proinnsias de Búrca (1904–1996) collected from him in the days of the Irish Folklore Commission (1935–1971). In later years, he was recorded by Séamas Ó Catháin of the Department of Irish Folklore from 1975 for more than ten summers. A great deal of this work was published in "Scéalta Chois Cladaigh" ("Stories of Sea and Shore") in 1983 by the Folklore of Ireland Council (Comhairle Bhéaloideas Éireann). 

Ó hEinirí also provided a large number of words and expressions to the lexicographer Tomás de Bhaldraithe, who incorporated these into his influential English-Irish Dictionary, published in 1959. In addition to this, he gave over 800 minor place-names to Patrick O'Flanagan of the Folklore Commission for the 1974 book The Living Landscape, Kilgalligan, Erris.

TV appearances 

Ó hEinirí was filmed for the 6-part BBC documentary In Search of the Trojan War, which was broadcast in 1985. According to the documentary, he was illiterate. He also featured on a Morning Ireland report broadcast on 25 July that year.

In 1986 Ó hEinirí featured in Episode 8 of the Emmy-award winning series The Story of English, also produced by the BBC, which discussed the Irish influence on the English language.

Linguistic significance

It was estimated by Whitley Stokes that there were around 800,000 monolingual Irish speakers in 1800, which had declined to about 320,000 by the end of the famine, and to less than 17,000 by 1911. Monolingual speakers remained in the 1950s, but by the 1980s and 1990s they had all but disappeared. Ó hEinirí may have been the last monolingual speaker of the Irish language.

Later life and death 

He died on 26 July 1998 and was survived by his wife, Máire (who died in 2001). He is buried in Kilgalligan Cemetery.

References

1915 births
1998 deaths
People from County Mayo
Irish-language writers
Irish folklorists
Irish storytellers